King of the Congo is a 1952 American 15 chapter movie serial, the 48th released by Columbia Pictures. It was produced by Sam Katzman, directed by Spencer Gordon Bennet and Wallace Grissell, and stars Buster Crabbe. The serial also co-stars Gloria Dea, Leonard Penn, Jack Ingram, Rick Vallin, Nick Stuart, William Fawcett, and Rusty Wescoatt. King of the Congo was based on the comic book character "Thun'da", created by Frank Frazetta, and published by Magazine Enterprises.

King of the Congo centers around a U.S. Air Force captain and his quest to find missing microfilm containing information vital to the United States government. His journey takes him across the Atlantic all the way to a jungle in Africa.

Plot
Captain Roger Drum (Buster Crabbe) shoots down an enemy plane carrying microfilm while on its way to Africa to deliver it an enemy of America. Intent on revealing this subversive group for whom the microfilm's message is intended, Drum assumes the enemy pilot's identity. He flies his twin-engine aircraft across the Atlantic, where he forced to crash it in a remote African jungle. Drum is rescued by the all- female Rock People, led by Princess Pha. He is renamed Thunda, King of the Congo, after he repeatedly rings a temple gong using a large stone mallet, sounding the alarm to an attack by the primitive, all-male Cave Men. With the subversives believing Thunda is their missing pilot, and with the Rock People under constant attack from the Cave Men, Captain Drum plots to bring down the subversives who are searching for a new metal more radioactive and powerful than Uranium. At the serial's conclusion, Thunda (Drum) clears the jungle of America's enemy and is able to reunite, as one tribe, the all-female Rock People and all-male Cave Men.

Cast

Chapter titles
 Mission of Menace
 Red Shadows in the Jungle
 Into the Valley of Mist
 Thunda Meets His Match
 Thunda Turns the Tables
 Thunda's Desperate Charge
 Thunda Trapped
 Mission of Evil
 Menace of the Magnetic Rocks
 Lair of the Leopard
 An Ally from the Sky
 Riding Wild
 Red Raiders
 Savage Vengeance
 Judgment of the Jungle
Source:

Production
King of the Congo was both the last Tarzan-style serial made and last serial to star Buster Crabbe.  Crabbe starred in nine serials between 1933 and 1952:
Tarzan the Fearless (1933) as Tarzan
Flash Gordon (1936) as Flash Gordon
Flash Gordon's Trip to Mars (1938) as Flash Gordon
Red Barry (1938) as Red Barry
Buck Rogers (1939) as Buck Rogers
Flash Gordon Conquers the Universe (1940) as Flash Gordon
The Sea Hound (1947) as Captain Silver
Pirates of the High Seas (1950) as Jeff Drake
King of the Congo (1952) as Captain Roger Drum and "Thunda"

Filming locations
Iverson Movie Ranch, Chatsworth, Los Angeles.

See also
 List of film serials by year
 List of film serials by studio

References

External links
Buster Crabbe filmography
BFI - Film & TV database

1952 films
American fantasy adventure films
1950s English-language films
Columbia Pictures film serials
1950s fantasy adventure films
American black-and-white films
Films based on American comics
Films directed by Spencer Gordon Bennet
Films with screenplays by George H. Plympton
1950s American films